The St. Alban's Tavern group was an informal association of 78 British Members of Parliament who aimed to bring about a reconciliation of William Pitt the Younger and Charles James Fox in a unified Ministry. They were named after the St. Alban's Tavern where the members met from January 1784.

Background
The group were largely composed of 'independent country gentlemen' who held themselves free from party allegiance. On 26 January 1784 the group came to a resolution "to support the party who should in the present distracted moment manifest a disposition to union". Given the weakness of Pitt's government, which was in a minority in the House of Commons, he accepted the group's proposition but insisted that a government must be formed "with principle and honour". Fox spoke through the Duke of Portland, who had been titular Prime Minister during the Fox-North Coalition: the Duke insisted that Pitt had come to power through unconstitutional means, and therefore must first resign before a new Ministry was appointed.

In reality, neither Pitt nor Fox believed the group had any prospect of success, but both felt obliged to treat them with respect. Possibly in ignorance of the personal bitterness between Pitt and Fox, the promoters of reconciliation are described as "well-meaning and naive" by the History of Parliament. The failure of negotiations left the group itself split, with 45 members supporting Pitt and 30 supporting Fox.

Members of the group
The membership of the group was published in the Annual Register for 1784. Analysis in the introductory survey to the History of Parliament 1754-1790 indicates that  five of the 78 were from Scottish constituencies, and a large proportion of the members were returned from English counties. The leader was Thomas Grosvenor, MP for Chester, who on 2 February 1784 successfully moved a House of Commons motion which called "for a firm, efficient, extended and united Administration". The members of the group were:

References
 History of Parliament 1754-1790
 Annual Register, 1784, p. 268-269

1784 establishments in Great Britain
Parliament of Great Britain
Political organisations based in the United Kingdom